Whulshootseed, also called Twulshootseed, was a Native American language in Washington, which was spoken by the Muckleshoot, Puyallup, Suquamish, Duwamish, Nisqually, and Squaxin Island tribes. Whulshootseed is a southern dialect of Lushootseed, which is part of the Coast Salish language group. The last native speaker was Ellen Williams (1923-2016).

Whulshootseed was taught at the Muckleshoot Language Program of the Muckleshoot Tribal College in Auburn, Washington, at a local school, and by the Puyallup Tribal Language Program. A 1999 video, Muckleshoot: a People and Their Language profiles the Muckleshoot Whulshootseed Language Preservation Project.

See also 
Lushootseed language

References

External links 
The Whulshootseed alphabet
Placenames, Squaxin Island tribe
Puyallup Tribal Language Program, Whulshootseed learning materials

Indigenous languages of the Pacific Northwest Coast
Extinct languages of North America
Coast Salish languages
Indigenous languages of Washington (state)
Native American language revitalization